Linden Township may refer to the following townships in the United States:

 Linden Township, Winnebago County, Iowa
 Linden Township, Brown County, Minnesota
 Linden Township, Union County, New Jersey, see Linden, New Jersey

See also 
 Linden Grove Township, St. Louis County, Minnesota